The Karlal (Urdu: کڑلال), also known as Karral, Kiraal, and  Sardar is a Hindko and Pahari speaking tribe dwelling mostly in the Abbottabad District of the Hazara Division region of Khyber-Pakhtunkhwa, Pakistan.

Etymology and origins
The Karlal oral tradition states that the tribe is descended from a man named Kallar Shah who had migrated to present-day Abbottabad district from present day Afghanistan.

After Pakistan's independence
In 1957, Mohammad Abdul Ghafoor Hazarvi, a Karlal, became the first recipient of the highest civilian award of Pakistan, the Nishan-e-Imtiaz. Most Karlals today are still living in their ancestral villages in the Galiyat and the Nilan Valley of the Abbottabad District. More recently, the Karlals, lead by Baba Haider Zaman Khan along with some other tribesmen of Hazara, have engaged in a political struggle to separate the Hazara Division from Khyber-Pakhtunkhwa in order to form a Hazara Province.

References

Hindkowan tribes
Social groups of Khyber Pakhtunkhwa